Dast-e Khezr (also Romanized as Dast-e Kheẕr; also known as Kheẕr) is a village in Kaftarak Rural District, in the Central District of Shiraz County, Fars Province, Iran. At the 2006 census, its population was 5,540, in 1,401 families.

References 

Populated places in Shiraz County